Beroe is a Bulgarian professional football club which are based in Stara Zagora. During the 2017/18 campaign they will be competing in the following competitions: First League, Bulgarian cup.

Friendlies

Competitions

First League

Regular season

Table

Results summary

Results by matchday

Matches

Championship stage

References

External links
Official website

Bulgarian football clubs 2017–18 season
PFC Beroe Stara Zagora